Anne Julie de Melun (Anne Julie Adélaïde; 1698 – 18 May 1724) was a French court office holder. She served as deputy Governess of the Children of France.

Biography
Born in 1698, she was baptised with the names Anne Julie Adélaïde and was known as Anne Julie. Born as the second of two children to Louis de Melun, Prince d'Epinoy, and his wife Élisabeth Thérèse de Lorraine, princesse de Lillebonne, and thus member of House of Melun. Her brother Louis de Melun disappeared in 1724, two months after her death.

She was the Lady of Boubers in her own right.  The peerage was confiscated in 1789.

At the age of roughly fifteen, she married Jules, Prince of Soubise. The couple were wed in Paris on 16 September 1714.  Her husband was a member of the Princely House of Rohan and with the marriage, Anne Julie took on the style of Her Highness. 

She and her husband were second cousins.  Anne Julie was an under governess to the children of France working with Madame de Ventadour, her husband's maternal grandmother. 

The couple had five children in all, among them Charles de Rohan, Duke of Rohan-Rohan the famous general of Louis XV as well as Madame de Marsan.  She and her husband died in Paris of smallpox. Her eldest son Charles succeeded as Prince of Soubise. Her brother's disappearance, led to the Principality of Epinoy (previously enjoyed by Anne Julie's father) was given to her son, Charles.

She died of smallpox in her twenties.

Issue

Charles de Rohan, Prince of Soubise, Duke of Rohan-Rohan (16 July 1715–4 July 1787) married Princess Anne Marie Louise de La Tour d'Auvergne (1722–1739) and had issue; married again to Princess Anna Teresa of Savoy (1717–1745) and had issue; married Princess Anna Viktoria of Hessen-Rheinfels-Rotenburg (1728–1792) no issue;
François Armand Auguste de Rohan, Cardinal de Soubise, Prince of Tournon (1 December 1717–28 Juin 1758)
Marie Louise Geneviève de Rohan (7 January 1720–4 March 1803) married Prince Gaston Jean Baptiste of Lorraine, Count of Marsan,, no issue;
François Auguste de Rohan, Count of Tournon (16 September 1721–6 August 1736) never married;
René de Rohan, Abbot of Luxeuil (26 July 1723–7 February 1743) never married.

Ancestry

References and notes

1698 births
1724 deaths
Anne Julie
Anne Julie
Deaths from smallpox
Anne Julie
Boubers, Lady of, Anne Julie de Melun
Anne Julie
Anne Julie
People of the Regency of Philippe d'Orléans
People of the Ancien Régime
Governesses to the Children of France
18th-century French people
18th-century French women
17th-century French people
17th-century French women